Blackshaw is a civil parish in the Calderdale metropolitan borough of West Yorkshire, England.  It contains the village of Blackshaw Head.  According to the 2001 census the parish had a population of 935, increasing to 992 at the 2011 Census.

Governance
Blackshaw is a civil parish and part of the Calder ward of Calderdale, a metropolitan borough within the ceremonial county of West Yorkshire in England.

See also
Listed buildings in Blackshaw

References

External links

Civil parishes in West Yorkshire